The 1998–99 season was Burnley's 4th successive season in the third tier of English football. They were managed by Stan Ternent in his first full season since he replaced Chris Waddle at the beginning of the campaign.

Appearances and goals

|}

Transfers

In

Out

Matches

Second Division

Final league position

League Cup

1st Round First Leg

1st Round Second Leg

FA Cup

1st Round

Football League Trophy

Northern Section 1st Round

References

Burnley F.C. seasons
Burnley